Pomegranate juice is made from the fruit of the pomegranate. It is used in cooking both as a fresh juice and as a concentrated syrup.

Possible health benefits and risks
Various primary studies have been conducted into possible health benefits derived from drinking pomegranate juice, but there is no strong evidence to suggest any effect in blood pressure management, cancer treatment, glucose and insulin management, or heart disease. Any potential benefits also need to be balanced against its high caloric content derived from its natural sugars.

Drug interactions may also be possible. A 48-year-old man with possible underlying myopathy was uneventfully treated with ezetimibe 10 mg/day and rosuvastatin 5 mg every other day for 17 months. After three weeks of drinking 200ml pomegranate juice twice a week, he presented urgently with thigh pain and an elevated serum creatine kinase level indicating rhabdomyolysis. Doctors suspected competitive inhibition of P450 enzymes in the liver by the pomegranate juice (much like grapefruit juice).

Marketing
The health benefits of pomegranate juice were promoted by POM Wonderful, a pomegranate products manufacturer. As of September 2010, the company and its principals were the subjects of a false advertising complaint by the Federal Trade Commission (FTC). In May 2012, after a hearing, the administrative law judge issued an opinion upholding certain false advertising allegations in the FTC's complaint—based on implied as opposed to express claims—and finding for POM Wonderful on other points. , POM Wonderful's action in the U.S. District Court was pending consideration.

Pomegranate molasses

Pomegranate molasses is a fruit syrup made from pomegranate juice, not sugarcane-derived molasses. It is a reduction from the juice of a tart variety of pomegranate, evaporated to form a thick, dark red liquid. Pomegranate molasses is often used on top of meatloaf or meatballs to give them a shiny glaze and can be also be used for drizzling over rice pudding or oatmeal. It is used in Iranian fesenjān and Turkish dolma and various salads such as çoban salatası. It is called  (rob e ænar) in Persian,  (dibs rumman) in Arabic, nar ekşisi in Turkish, narşərab in Azerbaijani.

See also
 
 Juicing
 List of juices

References

Further reading

Articles
 Pomegranate (National Institutes of Health - Produced by the National Library of Medicine)
 M. Viuda-Martos, J. Fernández-López, and J.A. Pérez-Álvarez (2010) - "Pomegranate" (Comprehensive Reviews in Food Science and Food Safety)

Books
 Levin, Gregory M. (2006). Pomegranate Roads: A Soviet Botanist's Exile from Eden. Floreant Press.  
 Seeram, N.P.; Schulman, R.N.; Heber, D. (eds.; 2006). Pomegranates: Ancient Roots to Modern Medicine. CRC Press.

External links 
 

Arab cuisine
Fruit juice
Pomegranate drinks
Iranian drinks
Israeli cuisine
Azerbaijani cuisine
Turkish condiments
Armenian drinks